Bagrat II may refer to:

 Bagrat II of Iberia, King in 958–994
 Bagrat II of Tao (died in 966)